The NCAA Division I men's ice hockey tournament is a college ice hockey tournament held in the United States by the National Collegiate Athletic Association (NCAA). Like other Division I championships, it is the highest level of NCAA men's hockey competition.

Broadmoor Ice Palace in Colorado Springs, Colorado hosted the tournament for the first ten years and has hosted eleven times overall, the most of any venue. Denver and Michigan have won the most tournaments with nine, while Vic Heyliger has coached the most championship teams, winning six times with Michigan between 1948 and 1956. Jerry York has made the most appearances in the title game with nine, going 5–4 in the process.

Champions

Team titles

Host cities

(*)denotes future Frozen Fours
(**)Detroit was to host the 2020 tournament, which was cancelled due to the Coronavirus pandemic.

Regional host cities

Note: Regional Tournaments were not conducted until 1992

Note: Manchester, New Hampshire was originally selected to host the 2021 Northeast Regional, but withdrew due to the Coronavirus pandemic. The 2021 Northeast Regional was subsequently re-awarded to Albany, New York.

(*)denotes future Frozen Four Regionals
(**)denotes cities that were to host 2020 regional sites, which were cancelled due to the Coronavirus pandemic.

Multiple meetings

See also
List of NCAA Division I men's ice hockey seasons
List of NCAA Division I Ice Hockey Tournament Most Outstanding Player

References
General

Specific

Champions
NCAA Division I men's ice hockey tournament Champions
NCAA